Constance Mauny (born 17 December 1998) is a French female handballer who plays for Brest Bretagne Handball and the French national team as a left wing.

Achievements

Club

International 

 EHF Champions League
 Finalist: 2021 (with Brest Bretagne Handball)

Domestic 

 French league (Division 1 Féminine):
 Winner : 2021 (with Brest Bretagne Handball)
 Tied 1st: 2020 (with Brest Bretagne Handball)
 Runner up: 2022 (with Brest Bretagne Handball)
 3rd: 2019

 French Cup (Coupe de France):
 Winner : 2019, 2021 (with Brest Bretagne Handball)

National team 

 European Women's U-19 Handball Championship:
 Winner : 2017

Awards and recognition
 Championnat de France Best Hope: 2017

References
 

     
1998 births
Living people 
French female handball players